"Il mare calmo della sera" is a song written by Zucchero Fornaciari, Gian Pietro Felisatti and Gloria Nuti, for Andrea Bocelli. Bocelli won the Sanremo Festival in 1994, singing the song, which was later released as his debut single. It is among Bocelli's most popular and well-known songs.

The chorus opening phrase is virtually the same as the chorus opening phrase in "She Believes in Me", the title of a song recorded by American country music singer Kenny Rogers released in April 1979 as the second single from his album The Gambler.

History

In 1992, Bocelli's first break as a singer came when Italian rock singer Zucchero Fornaciari auditioned tenors to record a demo version of "Miserere", which he had co-written with U2's Bono. Passing the audition, Bocelli recorded the tune as a duet with Pavarotti, with whom he became very close friends, even singing at his second wedding, and funeral. After touring all over Europe with Zucchero in 1993, Bocelli was then invited to perform at the Pavarotti & Friends, held in Modena, Italy in September 1994.

Bocelli was then signed to Sugar Music by Caterina Caselli, who  persuaded him to participate in the Sanremo music festival. He eventually won the newcomer section of the competition in 1994, with "Il mare calmo della sera".

After the festival, Bocelli released his first studio album, also titled Il mare calmo della sera. The single was also included in both of Bocelli's Greatest hits albums, Romanza in 1997, and The Best of Andrea Bocelli: Vivere in 2007.

Bocelli also recorded a Spanish-language version of the song, titled "El silencio de la espera", which peaked at number one in Panama. This version appeared on the Spanish edition of Romanza (1997).

Si (Forever Diamond Edition version/ English Chorus version)
In 2019, following the 1 millionth selling of Si, was also the 25th anniversary of Il Mare Calmo De La Sera’s 
release. Zucchero returned along with Giampiero Felisatti and Gloria Nuti, moving away from the track’s Italian-language pop-rock format in exchange for an epic orchestral crossover combined with Andrea singing the chorus in English.

Charts

Weekly charts

Italian version

Spanish version

References

External links
 Bocelli on Ultratop.be
 Bocelli on acharts.us

Andrea Bocelli songs
1994 debut singles
Songs written by Zucchero Fornaciari
Sanremo Music Festival songs
1994 songs
Sugar Music singles